Buttzville is an unincorporated community and census-designated place (CDP) located within White Township in Warren County, New Jersey, United States, that was created as part of the 2010 United States Census. As of the 2010 Census, the CDP's population was 146.

History
Buttzville was founded in 1839 by Michael Robert Buttz, and named for his son, Liam Oakes Buttz. It has frequently been noted on lists of unusual place names.

Geography
According to the United States Census Bureau, the CDP had a total area of 0.283 square miles (0.732 km2), including 0.282 square miles (0.729 km2) of land and 0.001 square miles (0.003 km2) of water (0.44%).

Demographics

Census 2010

Transportation
Buttzville lies along U.S. Route 46 at the north end of Route 31 (formerly Route 69).

References

Census-designated places in Warren County, New Jersey
White Township, New Jersey